Craig Ball may refer to:
 Craig Ball (musician), American swing clarinet player
 Craig Ball (forensic analyst), American computer forensic analyst and former trial lawyer
 Craig Ball (actor) from Home and Away